Leonard Harry Cleaver (27 October 1909 – 7 July 1993) was a British Conservative politician.  He was elected as Member of Parliament (MP) for the Birmingham Yardley constituency at the 1959 general election, winning the marginal seat from Labour.  Cleaver served until the 1964 general election, when the seat was won by Labour candidate Ioan Evans.

References

External links 

1909 births
1993 deaths
Conservative Party (UK) MPs for English constituencies
UK MPs 1959–1964